Southtrap Rock is an isolated rock lying west of Cape Juncal, D'Urville Island, in the Joinville Island group. In association with Northern Rocks, so named by the United Kingdom Antarctic Place-Names Committee (UK-APC) in 1963 because the rock is the southernmost of two groups of features which should be avoided by vessels entering Antarctic Sound from the north.

Rock formations of the Joinville Island group